True north (also called geodetic north or geographic north) is the direction along Earth's surface towards the place where the imaginary rotational axis of the Earth intersects the surface of the Earth. That place is called the True North Pole. True south is the direction opposite to the true north. North per se is one of the cardinal directions, a system of naming orientations on the Earth. There are multiple ways of determining north in different contexts. 

It is important to make a distinction to the magnetic north and Magnetic North Pole which is a less steady location close to the True North Pole determined by a compass and the magnetic field of the Earth. Due to fundamental limitations in map projection, true north also differs from the grid north which is marked by the direction of the grid lines on a typical printed map. However, the longitude lines on a globe lead to the true poles, because the three dimensional representation avoids those limitations.

The celestial pole is the location on the imaginary celestial sphere where an imaginary extension of the rotational axis of the Earth intersects the celestial sphere. Within a margin of error of 1°, the true north direction can be approximated by the position of the pole star Polaris which would currently appear to be very close to the intersection, tracing a tiny circle in the sky each sidereal day. Due to the axial precession of Earth, true north rotates in an arc with respect to the stars that takes approximately 25,000 years to complete. Around 2101–2103, Polaris will make its closest approach to the celestial north pole (extrapolated from recent Earth precession). The visible star nearest the north celestial pole 5,000 years ago was Thuban.

On maps published by the United States Geological Survey (USGS) and the United States Armed Forces, true north is marked with a line terminating in a five-pointed star. The east and west edges of the USGS topographic quadrangle maps of the United States are meridians of longitude, thus indicating true north (so they are not exactly parallel). Maps issued by the United Kingdom Ordnance Survey contain a diagram showing the difference between true north, grid north, and magnetic north at a point on the sheet; the edges of the map are likely to follow grid directions rather than true, and the map will thus be truly rectangular/square.

References

Sources
 

 

Geography of the Arctic
Cartography
Chinese discoveries
Navigation
Orientation (geometry)